The chancellor of Germany is the political leader of Germany and the head of the federal government. The office holder is responsible for selecting all other members of the government and chairing cabinet meetings.

The office was created in the North German Confederation in 1867, when Otto von Bismarck became the first chancellor. With the unification of Germany and establishment of the German Empire in 1871, the Confederation evolved into a German nation-state and its leader became known as the chancellor of Germany. Originally, the chancellor was only responsible to the emperor. This changed with the constitutional reform in 1918, when the Parliament was given the right to dismiss the chancellor. Under the 1919 Weimar Constitution the chancellors were appointed by the directly elected president, but were responsible to Parliament.

The constitution was set aside during the 1933–1945 Nazi dictatorship. During Allied occupation, no independent German government and no chancellor existed; and the office was not reconstituted in East Germany, thus the head of government of East Germany was chairman of the Council of Ministers. The 1949 Basic Law made the chancellor the most important office in West Germany, while diminishing the role of the president.

North German Confederation (1867–1871) 
 Federal Chancellor of the North German Confederation

The North German Confederation came into existence after the German Confederation was dissolved following the Prussian victory in the Austro-Prussian War of 1866. The chancellor was appointed by the Bundespräsidium, a position that was held constitutionally by the Prussian king.

German Reich (1871–1945)

German Empire (1871–1918) 
 Reich Chancellor of the German Reich
The German Empire was born out of the North German Confederation as result of the Franco-Prussian War (1870/71). The Präsidium (the Prussian king), which now had also the title Emperor, named the chancellor.

Political parties:

Weimar Republic (1918–1933) 
On 9 November 1918, Chancellor Max von Baden handed over his office to Friedrich Ebert. Ebert continued to serve as head of government during the three months between the end of the German Empire in November 1918 and the first gathering of the National Assembly in February 1919 as Chairman of the Council of the People's Deputies, until 29 December 1918 together with USPD Leader Hugo Haase.

The Weimar Constitution of 1919 set the framework for the Weimar Republic. The chancellors were officially installed by the president; in some cases the chancellor did not have a majority in parliament.

Political parties:

Nazi Germany (1933–1945) 
Adolf Hitler's  (seizure of power) marked the end of the Weimar Republic and the beginning of Nazi Germany. Hitler reigned as dictator and consolidated all power to himself. After the death of president Hindenburg, Hitler took over the president's powers and called himself Führer und Reichskanzler.

Federal Republic of Germany (1949–present) 
In 1949, two separate German states were established: the Federal Republic of Germany (known as West Germany) and the German Democratic Republic (known as East Germany). The list below gives the chancellors of West Germany; the government of East Germany was headed by the chairman of the Council of Ministers. In 1990, East Germany was dissolved as it merged with West Germany; Germany was reunified. It retained the name of the Federal Republic of Germany.

Political parties:

Timeline

See also 

 Leadership of East Germany
 List of chancellors of Germany by time in office
 List of German monarchs
 List of German presidents
 Minister-Presidents of the French "Saar protectorate"
 Religious affiliations of chancellors of Germany
 List of vice chancellors of Germany

References 

 
Chancellor
Germany